Hiroko Yamashita may refer to:

 Hiroko Yamashita (actress) (born 1963), Japanese actress
 Hiroko Yamashita (athlete) (born 1951), Japanese long jumper